María Paz Bascuñán Aylwin (2 June 1975), commonly known as Paz Bascuñán, is a Chilean theatre, film and television actress. Daughter of politician Mariana Aylwin and granddaughter of Chile's former president Patricio Aylwin, and has more than two descents, her Basque descent being recognized in 2002.

Biography 
She studied theatre in Universidad Católica de Chile and made her debut in Cerro Alegre from canal 13 (1999). In 2001, she made an appearance in the telenovela Piel Canela (2001) from canal 13 together with the protagonist Benjamin Vicuña.

In 2003, she switched to TVN with the telenovela Puertas Adentro (2004). She took the role of the daughter of a businessman, Javiera Martinez, who falls in love with a normal guy Jonathan Cárdenas (Ricardo Fernández) and she becomes pregnant, Los Pincheira (2004), Los Capo (2005), Cómplices (2006), Corazón de María (2007) and more recently in Viuda Alegre (2008).

In theater she became famous with the show Esa relación tan delicada (2002–2005) from the French author Loleh Bellon.

Her cinema appearances have been: Pretendiendo (2006) directed by Claudio Dabed, Santos (2007) directed by Nicolás López and Normal con Alas (2007) directed by Coca Gómez.

Filmography

Telenovelas 
 1999 – Cerro Alegre (Canal 13) - Heidi Astudillo
 2001 – Piel Canela (Canal 13) - Marcela Moreno
 2003 – Puertas Adentro (TVN) - Javiera Martínez
 2004 – Los Pincheira (TVN) - Trinidad Molina
 2005 – Los Capo (TVN) - Millarhaü
 2006 – Cómplices (TVN) - Francisca Durán
 2007 – Corazón de María (TVN) - Yasna Ceballos
 2008 – Viuda Alegre  (TVN)- Sofia Valdevenito
 2009 – Los exitosos Pells (TVN) - Daniela Caminero
 2010 – Martín Rivas  (TVN) - Mercedes Rivas
 2012/2014 – Soltera otra vez  (Canal 13) - Cristina Moreno
 2016/2017 – Preciosas (Canal 13) - Frida Segovia / Estrella Anís
 2020 – S.O.S. MAMIS - Trini
 2021 – Demente - Teresa Betancourt

Films 
 2006 – Pretendiendo - Fernanda
 2007 – Santos - Presentadora telediario
 2007 – Normal con Alas - Pascuala Cortazar
 2010 – Que pena tu vida - Mariana Vargas
 2012 – Aftershock - Pregnant woman
 2013 – The Green Inferno - Lucia
 2016 – Sin Filtro - Pía Vargas
 2018 – No estoy loca (película) - Carolina
 2019 – Dulce familia - Ale
 2020 – Cosas de Hombres - Nati

Series 
 2004 – Loco Por Ti (TVN)
 2004 – La Vida es una Lotería (TVN) - Mechita
 2009 – Una pareja dispareja (TVN) - Cassandra

References

External links 

1975 births
Living people
Actresses from Santiago
Chilean stage actresses
Chilean film actresses
Chilean telenovela actresses
Chilean television actresses
Chilean people of Basque descent
Chilean people of Croatian descent
Chilean people of Irish descent
Chilean people of Italian descent
Chilean people of Welsh descent
Pontifical Catholic University of Chile alumni
Aylwin family